C.S.I Ewart Matriculation Higher Secondary School (Ewart, pronounced you-urt) is a private Christian school founded in 1913 in what  is now Chennai, India. It gained matriculation status in 1945, and is managed by the Church of South India, Madras Diocese. The school mainly serves the communities of Purasawalkam, Vepery, Egmore, Kilpauk, Perambur, Sowcarpet. Ewart is fully accredited and is a member of the State School association. The classrooms are co-educational until 5th standard after which they become girls only.

History

Founding
In 1913, the Church of England Zenana Mission began Ewart as a 'finishing school' for Indian girls. Its goal was to bring Christian values as well as the poise and etiquette of an 'English' education to students in India. The school was named Ewart after its first donator, an Irish woman, Miss Ewart. With funding secured, the school started in an old mission house in Chennai with three students on roll.

Development of the school
Miss Frances Baker was the first principal of C.S.I Ewart matric hr.sec. school, presiding over it from 1913 to 1936. In honor of her services a house, "Frances Baker House", and a wing of the school "Frances Baker Block", were named after her.

The second principal of the school was Miss Alice Greene, she presided over the school from 1936 to 1952. In 1943 the school adopted the matriculation syllabus and began to offer Tamil and Hindi as second languages. The school auditorium and a house has been named after Miss Alice Green. Succeeding Miss Alice Green was Miss.C.Davamani, the third principal, who presided over the school from 1952 to 1970. She was the first Indian principal of Ewart.

The fourth principal was Mrs. C. Chelladurai (1970–1988). During her service she received both a National and State award for her leadership of the school. In 1978 the school was upgraded to the status of a Higher Secondary School.

In 2001, under the leadership of principal A. Williams, C.S.I Ewart was chosen to be one of three schools in Chennai to pilot test the Cambridge Young Learners English Tests. The test was designed by the University of Cambridge Local Examinations Syndicate (UCLES) for children aged seven to twelve in order to test a child's speaking skills.

In 2009, Sheila Lawrence became the seventh principal of Ewart. Beena Devaprasad took over as the Eighth Principal of Ewart School in 2019.

Principals

School hymn
The school hymn is written by Rudyard Kipling

Land of our birth, we pledge to thee
Our love and toil in the years to be
When we are grown and take our place
As men and women with our race

Father in heaven, who lovest all,
O help Thy children when they call
That they may build from age to age
An undefiled heritage.

Teach us delight in simple things,
And mirth that has no bitter Springs
Forgiveness free of evil done,
And love to all men neath the sun

Teach us the Strength that cannot seek,
By deed or thought, to hurt the weak-
That under thee, we may possess
Man's strength to comfort man's distress.

Teach us to look in all our ends
On Thee for judge, and not our friends-
That we with Thee, may walk, uncowed
By fear or favour of the crowd.

Land of our birth, our faith, our pride,
For whose dear sake our fathers died-
O Motherland, we pledge to thee,
Head, heart and hand through the years to be.

Ewart school culture

Events

Annual events
 Sports Day - annually in July, sports day is a one-day competitive event among the five houses in challenges including most track and field events, march past, bicycle races, and dance performances.
 Prize Day - In August, prizes are distributed to the winners of the events that took place during Sports Day. Other prizes, like the General proficiency prize and Best girl award, are distributed on this day.
 Pastiche  is an inter-school cultural event in which 20-30 schools from Chennai participate in to win contests. It is organized by the Interact club, which consists of all the 11th std. students.
 Inter house Dramatics - The five houses compete for first place. The event provides a platform for the students to showcase their talents in acting.

Special events
Carnival, Mission sale and teacher's day

Definite Clean Marina Programme(1997)
Under the leadership of principal Mrs. A. Williams C.S.I Ewart and Citi Plus, a voluntary organization, jointly co-sponsored an effort to clean Marina beach in Chennai. 1,200 students from 25 schools picked up the litter on a half kilometre stretch on both sides of the Gandhi Statue in the Marina beach on 31 August 1997. For the next 25 weeks, students from schools continued to clean the stretch of land every weekend.

Vepery Science Expo (2003)
Between 24–25 January 2003, Ewart held a science exhibition called "Vivikta 2003" and themed "A Futuristic Clean World". During the expo Ewarts introduced its plan to clean up the school and the surrounding neighborhood as a part of its larger effort for promoting environmental awareness.

AIDS Awareness (2004)
On 23 January 2004, the school organized an interactive session on AIDS with Dr. Fuller and Dr.Libman from the United States along with three doctors from Sri Ramachandra Medical College and Research Institute. About 400 girls from standard IX to XII interacted with Jon D.Fuller and Howard Libman, associate professors from Boston University School of Medicine and Harvard Medical School. Students asked a wide range of questions from mother-to-child transmission to the origins of HIV and to the symptoms of AIDS

DEAR, One World Reading Together (2005)
(Drop Everything and Read) - On 23 December 2005, in celebration of the One World Reading Together program started in 1999 by Scholastic Publishing, Ewart Students gathered together at noon in the school auditorium and read silently. At the end of this "DEAR" time, the students yelled "C.S.I. Ewart reads for 2006" and made pledge to reading for the upcoming year.

Houses
Ewart has five houses. Students are assigned a house when they enroll in the school. Houses compete against one another in annual events such as sports day or bake sales.

Awards

Teacher awards

SEED School Network Program Grant
In 2000, Ewartr received donated computer networking materials and a grant from the SEED organization to help improve the technology in the school. The SEED School Network Program offers to disadvantaged schools located in developing countries the financial and technical assistance needed to connect them to the Internet. Ewart used the grant money to set up a computer center and to train teachers on operating Windows 95, NT, and MS-Office. Ms. Mallika Ranjan lead the development, organization, and deployment of the new IT system at Ewart.

Ford Conservation and Environmental Grant
C.S.I Ewart was one of three schools awarded the Ford Conservation and Environmental Grant in November 2001. The total grant amount of Rs. 15 lakhs was distributed among the winners to support projects which aimed at preservation of their immediate environment and natural resources. Ewart's winning project proposal was titled 'Proliferating Vermiculture Practice by Community Participation,' and aimed to incorporate vermiculture units on camps to battle environmental pollution.

C.S.I. Ewart Global School

From January 2018, there's another school started inside the campus with a name C.S.I. Ewart Global School. This new school is affiliated to the CBSE board.

References

External links
 C.S.I Ewart School Page
 Wikimapia of Ewarts
 C.S.I Ewart Facebook Group

Church of South India schools
Christian schools in Tamil Nadu
Primary schools in Tamil Nadu
High schools and secondary schools in Chennai
Educational institutions established in 1913
1913 establishments in India
Church of England Zenana Missionary Society